KZ Tandingan is the self-titled debut album by Filipino singer KZ Tandingan, released in the summer of 2013. The album features original songs as well as covers.

Track listing

References 

2013 debut albums
KZ Tandingan albums